Nic nikomu o niczym is an album released by Polish punk rock band Karcer in 2002.

Track listing
narkotyk
limity
byłem w twoim domu
the death is not the end
moje miasto
biegnę
chory i zły
jeśli będę chciał
zbrodnia i kara
kołysanka
bluesy pierdu punk
to ja
nic nikomu o niczym
wiejski magik (czyli zajebiście ciężki kamień)
razem i osobno
mówię nie

Personnel
Krzysztof Żeromski - guitar, vocals
Adam Leo - bass guitar
Daniel Łukasik - drums

Resources
Band's official site
Jimmy Jazz Records

2002 albums
Karcer albums
Rock'n'roller albums